Lewis Glacier may refer to:

 Lewis Glacier (Antarctica)
 Lewis Glacier (Oregon), US
 Lewis Glacier (Washington), US
 Lewis Glacier, on Mount Kenya, Kenya

See also
 Rubble Glacier or Louis Glacier, Antarctica